Rurima Island is a small island in the Bay of Plenty, off New Zealand's North Island.

Kiore (Polynesian Rat) were eradicated in the 1980s, and Moutoki Island has long been an outpost for tuatara.

A wide shallow reef, almost a lagoon, stretches north from the pohutukawa-covered island. Snorkelling, diving and kayaking are popular activities here. The wreck of the SS Tasman, holed on the southwest reef in 1912, lies nearby. There is some geothermal activity on and near the islands.

See also

 New Zealand outlying islands
 List of islands of New Zealand
 List of islands
 Desert island

References

Uninhabited islands of New Zealand
Landforms of the Bay of Plenty Region